Connell Mansion is a historic home located at Ephrata, Lancaster County, Pennsylvania. It was built about 1860, and is a three-story, brick dwelling with a low hipped slate roof and octagonal cupola.  It has a two-story, rear section with a one-story extension, both with gable roofs.  Also on the property are a contributing carriage house and frame privy.

It was listed on the National Register of Historic Places in 1979.

References

Houses on the National Register of Historic Places in Pennsylvania
Houses completed in 1860
Houses in Lancaster County, Pennsylvania
National Register of Historic Places in Lancaster County, Pennsylvania